The Goethe Prize of the City of Frankfurt is an award for achievement "worthy of honour in memory of Johann Wolfgang von Goethe" made by the city of Frankfurt am Main, Germany. It was usually an annual award until 1955, and thereafter has been triennial. Following a decision of municipal authorities in 1952, the "Award of the Goethe Prize" only takes place every three years. Many recipients are authors, but persons working in several other creative and scientific fields have been honoured. The prize money is €50,000.

Recipients 

 1927 – Stefan George, Germany
 1928 – Albert Schweitzer, France
 1929 – , Germany
 1930 – Sigmund Freud, Austria
 1931 – Ricarda Huch, Germany
 1932 – Gerhart Hauptmann, Germany
 1933 – Hermann Stehr, Germany
 1934 – Hans Pfitzner, Germany
 1935 – , Germany
 1936 – Georg Kolbe, Germany
 1937 – Erwin Guido Kolbenheyer, Germany
 1938 – Hans Carossa, Germany
 1939 – Carl Bosch, Germany
 1940 – Agnes Miegel, Germany
 1941 – Wilhelm Schäfer, Germany
 1942 – Richard Kuhn, Germany
 1945 – Max Planck, Germany
 1946 – Hermann Hesse, Germany
 1947 – Karl Jaspers, Germany
 1948 – Fritz von Unruh, Germany
 1949 – Thomas Mann, Germany
 1952 – Carl Zuckmayer, Germany
 1954 – Theodor Brugsch, Germany
 1955 – Annette Kolb, Germany
 1958 – Carl Friedrich von Weizsäcker, Germany
 1960 – Ernst Beutler, Germany
 1961 – Walter Gropius, Germany
 1964 – , Germany
 1967 – Carlo Schmid, Germany
 1970 – György Lukács, Hungary
 1973 – Arno Schmidt, Germany
 1976 – Ingmar Bergman, Sweden
 1979 – Raymond Aron, France
 1982 – Ernst Jünger, Germany
 1985 – Golo Mann, Germany
 1988 – Peter Stein, Germany
 1991 – Wislawa Szymborska, Poland
 1994 – Ernst Gombrich, United Kingdom
 1997 – Hans Zender, Germany
 1999 – Siegfried Lenz, Germany
 2002 – Marcel Reich-Ranicki, Germany
 2005 – Amos Oz, Israel
 2008 – Pina Bausch, Germany
 2011 – Adunis, Syria
 2014 – Peter von Matt, Switzerland
 2017 – Ariane Mnouchkine, France
 2020 – Dževad Karahasan, Bosnia and Herzegovina

See also
 German literature
 List of literary awards
 List of poetry awards
 List of years in literature
 List of years in poetry
 Hanseatic Goethe Prize

References

External links
 

German literary awards
Johann Wolfgang von Goethe
Awards established in 1927
Literary awards of Hesse
1927 establishments in Germany
Triennial events
Culture in Frankfurt